Lannen (lux.: Lannen) is a village in northwestern Luxembourg.

It is situated in the commune of Redange and has a population of 105.

Gallery

References 

Villages in Luxembourg